Gara is a village in Srikakulam district of the Indian state of Andhra Pradesh.
It is also the mandal head quarters of Gara Mandal, Srikakulam District, AP.

Geography
It has an average elevation of 21 meters (72 feet).

Demographics
 Indian census, the demographic details of this mandal is as follows:
 Total Population: 75,017 in 17,154 households.
 Male Population: 37,373 and Female Population: 37,644		
 Children Under 6-years of age: 10,036	(Boys - 5,182 and Girls - 4,854)		
 Total Literates: 37,048

Transportation

Rail
The nearest railway station is Srikakulam road (Amadalavalasa) which is 20 km from Gara village.

Bus
Gara is well connected by bus service from Srikakulam town.

References 

Villages in Srikakulam district
Mandal headquarters in Srikakulam district